Michael Joseph John "Antone" Antonovich (born October 18, 1951) is an American former professional hockey player, and coach.  He was selected in the ninth round of the 1971 NHL Amateur Draft, 113th overall, by the Minnesota North Stars.  He is currently a scout for the Columbus Blue Jackets.

Amateur career 
Antonovich played high school hockey for Greenway High School in Coleraine, Minnesota, where he led Greenway to 3 straight Minnesota State High School Hockey Tourney trips, winning the State Championships in 1968 and 1969. 
 
After High School, Antonovich spent three seasons playing for the University of Minnesota, where he was tutored by coaches Glen Sonmor and Herb Brooks.  Despite being drafted by the North Stars, when Antonovich turned professional he joined the Minnesota Fighting Saints of the WHA.

Professional career 
Antonovich played most of his professional career in the WHA, with the Fighting Saints, Edmonton Oilers and New England Whalers.  He also appeared in NHL games with the North Stars, Hartford Whalers and New Jersey Devils, in addition to minor league games in the AHL and CHL. While playing professionally Antonovich also represented the United States at the 1976, 1977 and 1982 Ice Hockey World Championships.

Coaching and scouting 
Antonovich spent three seasons as an assistant coach in the International Hockey League, coaching the Minnesota Moose and Quad City Mallards.  He joined the amateur scouting staff of the St. Louis Blues in 1997, a position he still holds.

Political career 
In November 2008, Antonovich defeated incumbent John Sloan, and became the mayor of Coleraine, Minnesota. He has stated that he has no political motivations beyond his current position.

Awards and achievements
Played in 1978 WHA All-Star Game
CHL Second All-Star Team (1982)

Career statistics

Regular season and playoffs

International

Coaching statistics

References

External links

1951 births
American men's ice hockey centers
Edmonton Oilers (WHA) players
Hartford Whalers players
Ice hockey players from Minnesota
Living people
Maine Mariners players
Minnesota Fighting Saints players
Minnesota Golden Gophers men's ice hockey players
Minnesota North Stars draft picks
Minnesota North Stars players
Nashville South Stars players
New England Whalers players
New Jersey Devils players
People from Itasca County, Minnesota
Quad City Mallards (CoHL) players
St. Louis Blues scouts
Springfield Indians players
Tulsa Oilers (1964–1984) players
Wichita Wind players